Stanley Walpole (b. 1886 – d: March 14, 1968 (age 82) ) was an Australian actor of stage and screen who was one of the first Australians have success in American films.

Biography
Walpole worked for Bland Holt then with J.C. Williamson for six years.

He and his wife Ethel Phillips, along with Charles Villers, were the resident actors for Australian Photoplay Company.

In 1912 he moved to the USA and appeared in a number of films there, becoming a leading man for the Eclair Company.

He returned to Australia for eight months in Melbourne acting for J.C Williamsons, then returned to the US and was signed by Julius Stern for Universal Heights.

Select filmography
Dan Morgan (1911)
It Is Never Too Late to Mend (1911)
Captain Starlight, or Gentleman of the Road (1911)
Moora Neya, or The Message of the Spear (1911)
What Women Suffer (1911)
Cooee and the Echo (1912)
The Cheat (1912)
Whose Was the Hand? (1912)
Death's Short Cut (1914)
A Fiend and His Friends (1914)
The Alibi (1917)
 In Walked Mary (1920)
 A Woman's Business (1920)

References

External links

Stanley Walpole at AusStage

Male actors from Melbourne
Australian emigrants to the United States
1886 births
1968 deaths